The 2016 Judo Grand Prix Düsseldorf was held at the Mitsubishi Electric Halle in Düsseldorf, Germany from 19 to 21 February 2016.

Medal summary

Men's events

Women's events

Source Results

Medal table

References

External links
 

2016 IJF World Tour
2016 Judo Grand Prix
Judo
Judo competitions in Germany
Judo